Da Re is an Italian surname. Notable people with the surname include:

 Aldo Ray (1926–1991), American actor born Aldo Da Re
 Eric Da Re (born 1965), American actor
 Gianantonio Da Re (born 1953), Italian politician

Italian-language surnames